Zanguyeh (also Romanized as Zangūyeh) is a village in Mahmeleh Rural District, Mahmeleh District, Khonj County, Fars Province, Iran. At the 2006 census, its population was 215, in 42 families.

References 

Populated places in Khonj County